Neoboletus sinensis, known until 2014 as Boletus sinensis, is a species of bolete fungus in the family Boletaceae native to Hainan province in China. It is closely related to, and was previously considered a form of, Suillellus luridus. It was transferred to the new genus Neoboletus in 2014.

References

External links

sinensis
Fungi described in 1997
Fungi of China